The 2004 Taça de Portugal Final was the final match of the 2003–04 Taça de Portugal, the 64th season of the Taça de Portugal, the premier Portuguese football cup competition organized by the Portuguese Football Federation (FPF). The match was played on 16 May 2004 at the Estádio Nacional in Oeiras, and opposed two Primeira Liga sides: Benfica and Porto. Benfica defeated Porto 2–1, thanks to an extra-time goal from Portuguese winger Simão after the match had ended 1–1. Benfica players dedicated the trophy to Miklós Fehér.

In Portugal, the final was televised live on TVI and Sport TV. As Benfica claimed their 24th Taça de Portugal, they qualified for the 2004 Supertaça Cândido de Oliveira, where they took on the winners of the 2003–04 Primeira Liga, Porto, at the Estádio Cidade de Coimbra.

Match

Details

References

2004
2003–04 in Portuguese football
S.L. Benfica matches
FC Porto matches